The Scientist Supreme is a name used by different fictional characters appearing in American comic books published by Marvel Comics.

Description
The Scientist Supreme is often described to be the top leader of A.I.M., and can also be described to be the scientific counterpart to Earth's Sorcerer Supreme.

Known versions

Yandroth

Yandroth was the humanoid Scientist Supreme of the otherdimensional planet Yann, and a counterpart to Doctor Strange's title of Sorcerer Supreme.

Lyle Getz

Lyle Getz was the first individual to use the Scientist Supreme alias within A.I.M.. He spearheaded and supervised the experiment of MODOK and then Getz was killed by his own experiment afterwards.

Victorius

 
 
Victor Conrad was the second individual to use the Scientist Supreme persona within A.I.M.. An A.I.M. scientist working for A.I.M. who succeeded in duplicating the Super-Soldier Serum which had transformed Steve Rogers into Captain America, Conrad drank the serum himself and became a physically perfect human being. Naming himself Victorius, he first attempted to take over A.I.M. Failing to do so, he later adopted the death-worshiping philosophy of the Cult of Entropy and made himself their new leader. He stole the Cosmic Cube to use to create Jude the Entropic Man as a means of spreading destruction.<ref>Marvel Two-in-One #42</ref> Jude rebelled against Victorius, and when Jude, Victorius, the Cube and the Man-Thing all came into physical contact with each other, Jude and Victorius were transformed into a form of radiant crystal. Years later, Andrew Forson reveals that Mockingbird had been secretly working for him at the time and that Mockingbird was used to "get Victorius out of the way" in order to take over the Cult of Entropy.

George Clinton

George Clinton was the third individual to use the Scientist Supreme persona within A.I.M.. Clinton provided the Red Skull, Armin Zola and the Hate-Monger with a restored version of the Cosmic Cube; however, he gets his mind drained (along with many others) by the three supervillains as a power source for the very device that he helped restore.

Valdemar Tykkio

Valdemar Tykkio was the fourth individual to use the Scientist Supreme persona within A.I.M. Valdemar had occasional encounters with Iron Man while dealing with his brother Yorgon Tykkio trying to take his coveted position. 

Fifth A.I.M. Leader

A fifth individual had used the Scientist Supreme persona within A.I.M.. This Scientist Supreme had a deal with HYDRA to eliminate Madame Masque, resulting in a confrontation with Iron Man and the Hulk. 

Monica Rappaccini

Monica Rappaccini is the sixth individual to use the Scientist Supreme alias within A.I.M.

Hank Pym

At one point, Hank Pym grew to a large enough size where he encountered the cosmic entity Eternity, claiming to the former that he is Earth's "Scientist Supreme". When Hank Pym told Loki about this, the trickster god claims he was using Eternity's form in order to trick the so-called Scientist Supreme. Hank Pym disputed Loki's explanation. Whether or not it was indeed Loki-in-disguise has not been answered.

Andrew Forson

Andrew Forson is the seventh character within A.I.M. to use the title of Scientist Supreme. The character first appeared in Fantastic Four #610 and was created by Jonathan Hickman and Ryan Stegman.

Forson was the Scientist Supreme of A.I.M. after the organization became public and established their base in the now-sovereign island nation of Barbuda and overthrew the Wizard with consent of the rest of A.I.M.. Barbuda was then renamed A.I.M. Island.

Forson appears as the Supreme Leader of the new High Council of A.I.M., consisting of Graviton (as the Minister of Science), Jude the Entropic Man (as the Minister of Health), Mentallo (as the Minister of Home Affairs), Superia (as the Minister of Education in Bagalia), the female Super-Adaptoid (as the Minister of State in Bagalia), and the undercover Taskmaster (as the Minister of Defense). Forson then leads A.I.M. into attending a weapons expo, which led to A.I.M. fighting against the Secret Avengers. During the battle, Forson takes the opportunity to steal the Iron Patriot armor. Daisy Johnson launched an unsanctioned operation to send the Secret Avengers to A.I.M. Island to assassinate Forson, and the group seemingly killed him. Despite Johnson ending up suspended for breaking protocol and Maria Hill being put in charge of S.H.I.E.L.D. again, Forson was revealed to be alive all along, and the news of A.I.M. being a new permanent member of the Security Council is known.

Forson finds Superia badly injured after an incident on A.I.M. Island regarding an escaped creature. An A.I.M. Agent then approaches Forson and Superia, showing the two a 2-D hologram of the organism beating the Avengers. Taking pride in this, Forson orders their translocator activated and to retrieve their "lost child". When Taskmaster is shot and seemingly killed by Mockingbird now under Forson's control, Forson revealed that Mockingbird was secretly working for Forson years ago, and that he used Mockingbird to "get Victorious out of the way" so that he could take over the Cult of Entropy. Forson also uses Adaptoids from an alternate reality to combat the Avengers. Using an unidentified device, Forson and A.I.M. accelerate the flow of time in the limits of A.I.M. Island, creating in a matter of hours for the real world year of progress and transforming A.I.M. into a technologically advanced empire. When Smasher comes to the island, Forson has Jude the Entropic Man transform her into his messenger.

Forson is an experienced scientist with genius-level intellect.

In other media

Television
 The Lyle Getz incarnation of A.I.M.'s Scientist Supreme appears in Iron Man: Armored Adventures. In "Ready, A.I.M., Fire", he assists his fellow A.I.M. operatives in building MODOK. In "Designed Only For Chaos", A.I.M. uses the Living Laser to finish creating MODOK, who murders the Scientist Supreme so he can take control of A.I.M. even though Getz was planning to do so anyway.
 Two different incarnations of A.I.M.'s Scientist Supreme appear in The Avengers: Earth's Mightiest Heroes.
 An unidentified version appears in season one, voiced by Nolan North. In "Breakout, Part 1", he negotiates with Doctor Doom's agent Lucia von Bardas before Iron Man intervenes and captures the A.I.M. agents. They are transferred to the Vault, though they later escape off-screen. In "Alone Against A.I.M", the Scientist Supreme attempts to get revenge via the Technovore, but he is defeated by the Avengers. 
 Lyle Getz appears in season two, voiced by Kyle Hebert. During "Prisoner of War", he is captured and replaced by a Skrull infiltrator before he joins forces with Captain America and his fellow prisoners to escape. In "Secret Invasion", Skrull Queen Veranke orders the Skrull impersonating Getz to use satellite weapons to destroy all life on Earth in response to the Avengers foiling her invasion, but Thor destroys the satellites while the Skrulls are arrested by S.W.O.R.D.
 An amalgamated version of A.I.M.'s Scientist Supreme appears in the Avengers Assemble episode "Adapting to Change", voiced by Jim Meskimen. This version has George Clinton's appearance, Valdemar Tykkio's accent, and Andrew Forson's attire. The Scientist Supreme uses three Adaptoids to fight the Avengers before merging with them as the Supreme Adaptoid, only to be defeated by the heroes and absorbed for Ultron's humanoid form.
 The Monica Rappaccini incarnation of A.I.M.'s Scientist Supreme appears in Spider-Man, voiced by Grey DeLisle.
 The Monica Rappaccini incarnation of A.I.M.'s Scientist Supreme appears in M.O.D.O.K., voiced by Wendi McLendon-Covey.

Video games
 An unnamed male Scientist Supreme appears in Marvel Avengers Academy. This version is the leader of A.I.M. and the headmaster of the A.I.M. Institute of Super-Technology.
 An unnamed female Scientist Supreme appears in Marvel Strike Force.
 The Monica Rappaccini incarnation of A.I.M.'s Scientist Supreme appears in Marvel Powers United VR, voiced by Jennifer Hale.
 At the end of Marvel's Avengers'', Monica Rappaccini becomes A.I.M.'s Scientist Supreme. Additionally, Lyle Getz appears in the "Operation: Kate Bishop - Taking A.I.M." DLC as a rival to Rappaccini and an expert in tachyons. He is later defeated and imprisoned by Maria Hill, Hawkeye, and the Avengers.

References

External links
 Scientist Supreme at Marvel Wiki 
 Lyle Getz at Marvel Wiki
 George Clinton at Marvel Wiki
 Vlademar Tykkio at Marvel Wiki

Marvel Comics supervillains
Marvel Comics characters
Set index articles on comics
Marvel Comics scientists